Michael Andre Dixon Jr. (born December 1, 1990) is an American-born naturalized Georgian professional basketball player for Kolossos Rodou of the Greek Basket League. He is a 1.85 m (6 ft 1 in) tall combo guard. 

Following three years of college basketball at the University of Missouri, and one year at the University of Memphis, Dixon entered the 2014 NBA draft, but he was not selected in the draft's two rounds. He then went on to play professionally in Europe. In 2022, Dixon guided US Monastir to the Basketball Africa League (BAL) championship and was named the league's Most Valuable Player.

Following his naturalization in 2016, Dixon has represented the Georgia national team and played with the country at EuroBasket 2017.

High school career
Dixon played high school basketball at Lee's Summit West, in Lee's Summit, Missouri. He was ranked as the nation's 136th overall prospect, and number 22 point guard by Rivals.com.

College career

University of Missouri
Dixon played college basketball at the University of Missouri, with the Missouri Tigers, from 2009 to 2012. He played in all 34 games as a true freshman, averaging 7.5 points, 1.6 assists, 1.1 rebounds, and 1.0 steals per game. He shot 47.0 percent from the floor overall, 35.5 percent from three-point range, and led the team in free throw shooting, at 85.7 percent.  During his second campaign with the Tigers, he started 17 games, averaging 10.3 points per game, along with 2.5 rebounds, 3.5 assists, and 1.8 steals per game. Dixon, was also ranked in the Top 10 of the Big 12 in assists, steals, free throw percentage, and assist/turnover ratio. He was one of the country's most explosive guards, and was arguably college basketball's most valuable sixth man in the 2011–12 season, averaging 13.5 points and 3.3 assists per game, in 35 games (all off the bench).

University of Memphis
Dixon transferred to the University of Memphis, where he played his senior year of college basketball with the Memphis Tigers. Dixon saw action in all 34 games, and made four starts. He was the team's second-leading scorer (11.8 points per game) and the squad's leader in three-point field goal percentage (38.6%) and free throw percentage (84.4%). He handed out 81 assists (fourth on team), had 43 steals, and also averaged 2.2 rebounds per game.

Professional career

Dzūkija / Pieno žvaigždės (2014–2015)
After going undrafted in the 2014 NBA draft, Dixon joined Italian club Basket Barcellona on a 2-week tryout. He left the club without signing a contract with them. Dixon then officially began his pro career in the Lithuanian Basketball League with Dzūkija Alytus, in 2014. He left the team in November, and joined Lithuanian club Pieno žvaigždės Pasvalys for the rest of the season. On March 29, 2015, Dixon participated in the 2015 Lithuanian League All-Star Game, where he recorded nine points, four rebounds and three assists.

Dixon finished the season as the Lithuanian League fourth-leading scorer with 13.7 points per game. Dixon helped žvaigždės to reach the 2015 Baltic League Quarterfinals, but they eventually lost to Juventus.

ČEZ Nymburk (2015–2016)
On June 22, 2015, Dixon signed with the Czech team ČEZ Nymburk for the 2015–16 season. On January 10, 2016, Dixon recorded a career-high 35 points, shooting 12-of-16 from the field, along with six rebounds, four assists and two steals in a 76–70 win over Nizhny Novgorod.

In 62 games played during the 2015–16 season, he averaged 14.8 points, 3.1 rebounds, 4.6 assists and 1.4 steals, shooting 39.9 percent from 3-point range. Dixon helped Nymburk to win the 2016 Czech League Championship, as well as reaching the 2016 VTB League Playoffs as the eighth seed, but they eventually were eliminated by CSKA Moscow.

AEK Athens (2016–2017)
On June 21, 2016, Dixon moved to AEK Athens of the Greek League, where he signed a one-year contract with a prospect of renewal for another year. On December 7, 2016, Dixon recorded a season-high 29 points, shooting 8-of-12 from 3-point range, along with five rebounds and four assists in an 89–76 win over Szolnoki Olaj. On January 20, 2017, Dixon agreed to a contract extension with AEK, until the summer of 2019. On April 8, 2017, Dixon recorded 18 points, along with six rebounds and four assists in an 82–81 win over Kolossos Rodou. He was subsequently named Greek League Round 25 MVP.

In 50 games played during the 2016–17 season, he averaged 12.6 points, 2.5 rebounds, 2.5 assists and 1 steal per game. Dixon helped AEK to reach the 2017 Champions League Playoffs, but they eventually lost to Monaco in the quarterfinals.

Strasbourg / Bahçeşehir (2017–2018)
On August 5, 2017, Dixon parted ways with AEK and signed with French team SIG Strasbourg for the 2017–18 season. On December 9, 2017, he parted ways with Strasbourg. On December 14, 2017, he signed with Bahçeşehir Koleji of the Turkish Basketball First League.

Bnei Herzliya (2018–2019)
On August 17, 2018, Dixon signed a one-year deal with the Israeli team Bnei Herzliya. In 17 games played for Herzliya, Dixon averaged 12 points, 2.1 rebounds, 4.2 assists and 1.7 steals per game, shooting 41 percent from three-point range. On February 10, 2019, Dixon parted ways with Herzliya.

Reggio Emilia (2019)
On February 13, 2019, Dixon joined the Italian team Grissin Bon Reggio Emilia for the rest of the season.

Nymburk/Georgia (2019–2021)
Dixon signed with Nymburk of the National Basketball League (Czech Republic) in 2019. He averaged 11.0 points, 2.6 rebounds, 4.6 assists, and 1.6 steals per game. On December 4, 2020, Dixon signed an open contract with BC Titebi of the Georgian Superliga.

Cluj-Napoca (2021)
On January 5, 2021, he signed with U-BT Cluj-Napoca of the Liga Națională.

Wilki Morskie Szczecin (2021)
On July 8, 2021, he signed with Wilki Morskie Szczecin of the PLK.

US Monastir (2022)
On February 8, 2022, Dixon signed with US Monastir of the Tunisian Championnat National A (CNA) and the Basketball Africa League. He won the CNA championship and Tunisian Cup with Monastir in May 2022. On May 28, 2022, he won the club's first-ever BAL championship with Monastir after winning in the 2022 BAL Finals over Petro de Luanda. Dixon was named the Most Valuable Player after averaging a team-leading 16.5 points and 4.1 assists per game; along with scoring 21 points in the championship game.

Kolossos Rodou (2022–present)
On November 26, 2022, Dixon returned to Greece, signing with Kolossos Rodou.

Georgia national team
Dixon has citizenship with Georgia, in order to be able to play with the senior men's Georgian national basketball team. He was selected to be in the country's default squad for the EuroBasket 2017 qualification tournament, where he averaged 16.6 points, 3.2 rebounds, and 4.2 assists per game. He also played at EuroBasket 2017.

Career statistics

Domestic Leagues

|-
| style="text-align:center;" rowspan=3 | 2014–15
| style="text-align:left;" rowspan=1 |  Dzūkija
| style="text-align:center;" rowspan=2 | LKL
| 15 || 21.4 || .401 || .411 || .850 || 3.7 || 3.4 || .8 || .0 || 10.8
|-
| style="text-align:left;" rowspan=2 |  Pieno žvaigždės
| 24 || 21.9 || .502 || .368 || .791 || 3.0 || 3.6 || 1.2 || .1 || 15.5
|-
| style="text-align:center;" rowspan=1 | BBL
| 7 || 20.8 || .463 || .308 || .857 || 3.5 || 3.8 || 1.5 || .1 || 13.4
|-
| style="text-align:center;" rowspan=2 | 2015–16
| style="text-align:left;" rowspan=2 |  Nymburk
| style="text-align:center;" rowspan=1 | NBL
| 20 || 22.3 || .516 || .430 || .818 || 2.8 || 4.6 || 1.4 || .2 || 14.6
|-
| style="text-align:center;" rowspan=1 | VTB
| 31 || 23.2 || .454 || .398 || .881 || 2.7 || 4.6 || 1.3 || .1 || 14.3
|-
| style="text-align:center;" rowspan=1 | 2016–17
| style="text-align:left;" rowspan=1 |  A.E.K.
| style="text-align:center;" rowspan=1 | GBL
| 32 || 23.1 || .417 || .299 || .750 || 2.5 || 2.9 || .8 || .0 || 11.5
|-
| style="text-align:center;" rowspan=1 | 2017
| style="text-align:left;" rowspan=1 |  Strasbourg
| style="text-align:center;" rowspan=1 | Pro A
| 11 || 23.9 || .426 || .292 || .811 || 2.0 || 4.3 || 1.1 || .0 || 13.4
|-
| style="text-align:center;" rowspan=1 | 2017–18
| style="text-align:left;" rowspan=1 |  Bahçeşehir
| style="text-align:center;" rowspan=1 | TBL
| 28 || 27.5 || .461 || .385 || .833 || 2.0 || 3.8 || .9 || .1 || 14.1
|-
| style="text-align:center;" rowspan=1 | 2018–19
| style="text-align:left;" rowspan=1 |  Bnei Herzliya
| style="text-align:center;" rowspan=1 | IPL
| 17 || 24.7 || .411 || .410 || .903 || 2.1 || 4.2 || 1.7 || .0 || 12.0
|}

European Competitions

|-
| style="text-align:center;" rowspan=1 | 2015–16
| style="text-align:left;" rowspan=1 |  Nymburk
| style="text-align:center;" rowspan=1 | Europe Cup
| 11 || 25.8 || .516 || .352 || .846 || 4.5 || 4.8 || 1.6 || .2 || 16.7
|-
| style="text-align:center;" rowspan=1 | 2016–17
| style="text-align:left;" rowspan=1 |  A.E.K.
| style="text-align:center;" rowspan=1 | BCL
| 18 || 26.2 || .503 || .449 || .800 || 2.5 || 2.6 || 1.2 || .1 || 14.7
|-
| style="text-align:center;" rowspan=1 | 2017–18
| style="text-align:left;" rowspan=1 |  Strasbourg
| style="text-align:center;" rowspan=1 | BCL
| 6 || 20.3 || .646 || .471 || 1.000 || 2.5 || 4.3 || 1.0 || .2 || 13.0
|}
Source: RealGM

Personal life
Dixon is the son of Mike Dixon Sr. and Sybil Dixon, and he has one sister, Alexis, and one brother, Jarred, who plays college basketball for the Missouri State Bears. He graduated from the University of Memphis in May 2014, with a bachelor's degree in interdisciplinary studies. On December 2, 2016, Dixon was involved in a fatal car accident in Menidi, Athens, Greece, that caused the death of a 64-year-old male sanitation worker. Dixon was released from custody, after giving his testimony about the incident.

He has a son named Michael with Greek singer Sophia Kotsopoulou. The couple was expecting their second child in April 2021.

References

External links
Twitter Account
RealGM profile
FIBA profile
Draftexpress.com profile 
College stats @ Sports-Reference.com
Memphis Tigers bio

1990 births
Living people
AEK B.C. players
American expatriate basketball people in the Czech Republic
American expatriate basketball people in France
American expatriate basketball people in Greece
American expatriate basketball people in Israel
American expatriate basketball people in Italy
American expatriate basketball people in Lithuania
American expatriate basketball people in Turkey
American men's basketball players
Bahçeşehir Koleji S.K. players
Basketball players from Kansas City, Missouri
BC Dzūkija players
BC Pieno žvaigždės players
Bnei Hertzeliya basketball players
Basketball Nymburk players
Greek Basket League players
Kolossos Rodou B.C. players
Memphis Tigers men's basketball players
Men's basketball players from Georgia (country)
Missouri Tigers men's basketball players
Pallacanestro Reggiana players
Point guards
US Monastir basketball players
Shooting guards
SIG Basket players
Beirut Club players